The 2002 Irish Greyhound Derby took place during August and September with the final being held at Shelbourne Park in Dublin on 14 September 2002.

The winner Bypass Byway won €150,000 and was trained by Ollie Bray, owned by Michael Kearney and bred by Pat D'Arcy. The race was sponsored by the Paddy Power.

Final result 
At Shelbourne, 14 September (over 550 yards):

Distances 
5¼, 1¾, 1¼, 1, head (lengths)

Competition Report
The Irish public's favourite greyhound Late Late Show returned for another attempt at the 2002 Irish Derby but the leading ante-post greyhounds were Scottish Greyhound Derby champion Priceless Rebel and Droopys Rhys now under the care of Reggie Roberts instead of former trainer Ted Soppitt.

The first round ended with Bypass Byway setting the fastest time of 29.74 for trainer Ollie Bray and defeating Priceless Rebel. Vigorous Rex performed well in 29.76 but Late Late Show only managed a second place before being diagnosed with an injury and being withdrawn from the competition. Bypass Byway was the new favourite and he won again in 29.87 with Priceless Rebel eliminated in the same heat. Droopys Rhys dipped under 30 seconds recording 29.99 and then in the quarter-finals he recorded 29.77 success. The other heat winners were Tamna Rose, Borna Pilot and Droopys Agassi, the latter beat Bypass Byway who was lucky to still be in the competition following a stumble in the heat.

The first semifinal saw Bypass Byway hold off Droopys Rhys by half a length in a fast 29.68 with Heavenly Hero claiming the third place. In the other semi Droopys Agassi won from Tamna Rose and Tyrur Bello.

In the final Bypass Byway and Droopys Rhys vied for the lead with Droopys Agassi prominent. Bypass Byway kicked and drew clear of his main rival crossing the line in 29.42 which represented a new track record by no less than 15 spots (0.15sec). Heavenly Hero ran on well for third behind Droopys Rhys and Droopys Agassi faded into last place.

Quarter-finals

Semifinals

See also
2002 UK & Ireland Greyhound Racing Year

References

Greyhound Derby
Irish Greyhound Derby
Irish Greyhound Derby